Shia Chun Kang (Chinese: 谢俊康; pinyin: Xiè Jùnkāng; born 27 September 1996) is a Malaysian badminton player. Together with his former partner, Tan Wee Gieen, he achieved a career-high ranking of 52 in the men's doubles category.

Career 
He debuted in the 2013 Victoria International tournament. He was one of the semifinalists in the 2014 Auckland International. In 2017, he partnered with Tan Wee Gieen and reached the Malaysia International finals but lost to compatriots Goh Sze Fei and Nur Izzuddin.

They failed to win their first Superseries title as they were runners-up at the 2018 Orléans Masters, losing to Mark Lamsfuss and Marvin Seidel of Germany.

In 2019, he partnered with Tan Boon Heong and won the Perth International tournament. In the same year, they also entered the finals of both South Australia International and Dubai International respectively. They also participated in the 2019 Macau Open but lost to Li Junhui and Liu Yuchen in the first round.

Achievements

BWF World Tour (1 runner-up) 
The BWF World Tour, announced on 19 March 2017 and implemented in 2018, is a series of elite badminton tournaments, sanctioned by Badminton World Federation (BWF). The BWF World Tour are divided into six levels, namely World Tour Finals, Super 1000, Super 750, Super 500, Super 300 (part of the HSBC World Tour), and the BWF Tour Super 100.

Men's doubles

BWF International Challenge/Series (1 title, 3 runners-up) 
Men's doubles

  BWF International Challenge tournament
  BWF International Series tournament
  BWF Future Series tournament

References

External links 

 Shia Chun Kang at BWF.tournamentsoftware.com

Living people
1996 births
Malaysian sportspeople of Chinese descent
Malaysian male badminton players
People from Johor